The Architects Collaborative, 1945–1965 is a book written and edited by the founding partners of  The Architects' Collaborative (TAC) documenting some of TAC's work over a twenty-year period. The book is a monograph with many photographs, drawings and plans for each project with a modest amount of text. The book also includes biographies of the partners and a complete list of all TAC's projects from 1945–1965. In addition, all of the TAC partners wrote a description about each of the projects they were involved in, and their philosophy on TAC. The book was printed in Switzerland by Arthur Niggli Ltd. and in the United States by Architectural Book Publishing Co.

The book is out of print due to its datedness as some aspects covered in the book later became inaccurate.

Another book, The Architects Collaborative, 1945-1970, was an updated and expanded edition of the "1945-1965" book published in 1971 by Gustavo Gili, Barcelona.

External links
 WorldCat bibliographic records

Architecture books
1966 non-fiction books